St. Pius X is a Roman Catholic church in Fairfield, Connecticut in the Diocese of Bridgeport. The present Colonial-style church was designed by J. Gerald Phelan.

References

External links 
 Website
 Diocese of Bridgeport

Roman Catholic churches in Fairfield, Connecticut
Roman Catholic Diocese of Bridgeport
Churches in Fairfield County, Connecticut